The Saskatchewan Selects host the SK Summer Soccer Series where they verse other Canadian soccer teams. Saskatchewan Selects are an exhibition soccer team and are trying to become a Canadian Premier League team or bring a team to Saskatchewan.

History
Representatives from the Saskatchewan Selects soccer team converged at the Park Town Hotel in Saskatoon to unveil the team’s roster, its new jerseys and a partnership with Prairieland Park on May 1st 2019.

It is at times like this that we truly are “In This Together”.  What began as our slogan to bring a professional soccer club to Saskatchewan has even greater meaning with the circumstances we are facing today.

The Series
The SK Summer Soccer Series, launched in 2019, is a series of match events being staged in Saskatoon, SK featuring the SK Selects vs professional soccer teams across North America. The Series is an important project towards the development of a professional soccer club for the Province of Saskatchewan.

We’re In This Together!
The Event slogan “We’re In this Together” symbolizes the movement that is taking place by a group of diverse, passionate and hard-working people to bring a professional soccer club to the Province of Saskatchewan and which symbolizes the sense of community in Saskatchewan.  Soccer is the “Beautiful Game” which brings together communities, celebrates diversity and ignites the passion of the human spirit.

SK Summer Soccer Series 2019

2019 SK Summer Soccer Series Standings

SK Summer Soccer Series 2020

Seasons

External links
 https://sksss.ca/
 https://sksss.ca/2019-series/
 https://thestarphoenix.com/sports/soccer/saskatchewan-selects-unveil-team-roster-jerseys/
 https://northerntribune.ca/sk-summer-soccer-series-fc-edmonton/

Soccer in Saskatchewan
2019 establishments in Saskatchewan
Association football competitions